Nepean Shire was a local government area in the Central West region of New South Wales, Australia.

Nepean Shire was proclaimed on 7 March 1906, one of 134 shires created after the passing of the Local Government (Shires) Act 1905.  It absorbed the Municipality of Mulgoa on 1 July 1913.

The shire offices were in Bringelly. 

The shire was abolished on 1 January 1949 and its area split per the Local Government (Areas) Act 1948. Riding A was absorbed along with Municipality of St Mary's and Municipality of Castlereagh into the Municipality of Penrith, Riding B was absorbed into the Municipality of Liverpool, Riding C was absorbed into the Municipality of Camden.

References

Former local government areas of New South Wales
1906 establishments in Australia
1949 disestablishments in Australia